Urtakul (Urtakül) is a rural locality (a selo) and the administrative centre of Urtakulsky Selsoviet, Buzdyaksky District, Bashkortostan, Russia. The population was 437 as of 2010. There are 5 streets.

Geography 
Urtakul is located 12 km southwest of Buzdyak (the district's administrative centre) by road. Kiska-Yelga is the nearest rural locality.

References 

Rural localities in Buzdyaksky District